The 1958 News of the World Snooker Tournament was a professional snooker tournament sponsored by the News of the World. The tournament was won by Fred Davis who won 7 of his 9 matches, beating his brother Joe in all their three matches. Joe won 5 matches and finished in second place ahead of John Pulman by winning more frames overall. The News of the World Snooker Tournament ran from 1949/50 to 1959.

Format
There were four competitors: Joe Davis, Fred Davis, John Pulman and Walter Donaldson. Rather than 3-day matches of 37 frames, matches were over 13 frames on a single day with each playing the others three times. Originally the tournament was planned to take place over three consecutive weeks but the third week of matches were delayed for three weeks. Unlike previous News of the World tournaments there was no handicapping. All matches were played in Burroughes Hall, London.

The highest  of the competition was a 114 compiled by Fred Davis in his match against Pulman on 10 October. Davis also made the only other century break of the tournament, a 100 against Joe Davis on 18 October.

Results

Table

The positions were determined firstly by the number of matches won (MW) and, in the event of a tie, the number of frames won (FW).

References

News of the World Snooker Tournament
News of the World Snooker Tournament
News of the World Snooker Tournament 1958
News of the World Tournament
News of the World Snooker Tournament
News of the World Snooker Tournament